Fulgensius Billy Paji Keraf (born 8 May 1997) is an Indonesian professional footballer who plays as a winger for Liga 2 club PSDS Deli Serdang.

Club career

Persib Bandung
He made his professionally debut in the Liga 1 on 22 April 2017, against PS TNI. He signed in to substitute Angga Febryanto on 35 minutes first half. And his debut, He success give one assist to Atep in the 53rd minute.

On 3 May 2017, he scored his first goal against Gresik United in injury time and made Persib Bandung a 1–0 win over hosts Gresik United.

Borneo (loan)
He was signed for Borneo to play in the Liga 1 in the 2018 season, on loan from Persib Bandung. Keraf made his debut on 20 July 2018 in a match against PS TIRA. On 10 November 2018, Keraf scored his first goal for Borneo against PSIS Semarang in the 14th minute at the Segiri Stadium, Samarinda.

Badak Lampung
He was signed for Badak Lampung to play in the Liga 1 in the 2019 season. Keraf made his debut on 21 June 2019 in a match against Semen Padang at the Haji Agus Salim Stadium, Padang.

Kalteng Putra
In 2020, Billy Keraf signed a one-year contract with Indonesian Liga 2 club Kalteng Putra. This season was suspended on 27 March 2020 due to the COVID-19 pandemic. The season was abandoned and was declared void on 20 January 2021.

Persita Tangerang
He was signed for Persita Tangerang to play in the Liga 1 in the 2021 season. Keraf made his league debut on 28 August 2021 in a match against Persipura Jayapura at the Pakansari Stadium, Cibinong.

Honours

International 
Indonesia U-23
 AFF U-22 Youth Championship: 2019

References

External links
 
 Billy Keraf at Liga Indonesia

1997 births
Living people
Association football wingers
Indonesian footballers
Persib Bandung players
Borneo F.C. players
Badak Lampung F.C. players
Kalteng Putra F.C. players
Persita Tangerang players
PSDS Deli Serdang players
Liga 1 (Indonesia) players
Liga 2 (Indonesia) players
Sportspeople from East Nusa Tenggara